The Hollywood Juvenile Championship Stakes is an American Thoroughbred horse race run annually in early July at Hollywood Park Racetrack in Inglewood, California. Open to two-year-old horses, the Grade III event is contested on synthetic over a distance of six furlongs. Prior to 2007, the race was contested on dirt.

Its first winner was the filly, Unerring, American Champion Three-Year-Old Filly in 1939. Noted past winners include Tomy Lee (1958), Affirmed (1977), Desert Wine (1982), Althea, (1983), and Squirtle Squirt (2000).

The 2005 winner, What A Song, holds the World Record [all breeds] for 2F in 20.60 seconds.

Winners since 1991

Previous winners 
 1990 - Deposit Ticket
 1989 - Magical Mile
 1988 - King Glorius (Grade I winner.)
 1987 - Mi Preferido
 1986 - Captain Valid
 1985 - Hilco Scamper
 1984 - Saratoga Six (Multiple stakes winner.)
 1983 - Althea (1983 American Champion Two-Year-Old Filly.)
 1982 - Desert Wine
 1981 - The Captain
 1980 - Loma Malad (Motivity, a Filly, placed.)
 1979 - Parsec
 1978 - Terlingua (daughter of Secretariat and dam of Storm Cat.) (Flying Paster placed.)
 1977 - Affirmed
 1976 - Fleet Dragoon
 1975 - Restless Restless

References
 The 2008 Hollywood Juvenile Championship Stakes at the NTRA

1938 establishments in California
Horse races in California
Hollywood Park Racetrack
Flat horse races for two-year-olds
Graded stakes races in the United States
Recurring sporting events established in 1938